Lower Pannonia may refer to:

 Pannonia Inferior, a Roman province that existed between the years 103 and 296
 Principality of Lower Pannonia, a Slavic vassal principality, under Frankish suzerainty, during the 9th century

See also 
 Upper Pannonia (disambiguation)